Titirangi is a hill in Gisborne city, New Zealand. It is also known as Kaiti Hill, but this refers to the first ridge overlooking Poverty Bay and Gisborne. The hill is an ancestral site of the Ngāti Oneone hapū (sub-tribe) in Gisborne. It is at the base of this hill that Captain James Cook came ashore, after first sighting New Zealand in October 1769.

The 33 ha Titirangi Reserve is a tourist attraction; the hill has a Cook monument, a pohutukawa tree planted by Diana, Princess of Wales, the James Cook Observatory, a fitness course, a park, and four lookouts over Gisborne city and Poverty Bay. Other features include a World War II gun emplacement, a summit track and nature trails. At the base of the hill is the marae Te Poho-o-Rawiri, the home of Ngāti Oneone, which was built by Master-carver, Pine Taiapa.

References

External links
Titirangi, Poho o Rawiri, Cook Landing Site, Tourism Eastland Inc.

Forts in New Zealand
Landforms of the Gisborne District
Hills of New Zealand
Monuments and memorials to James Cook